Arthur Fleming Andrews (September 1, 1876 – March 20, 1930) was an American cyclist who competed in the early twentieth century.

He competed in cycling at the 1904 Summer Olympics in Missouri and won the silver in the 25 mile race and a bronze in the 5 mile race. He also reached the semifinals of the quarter mile race and was eliminated in the first round of the half mile race.

He was born in Muncie, Indiana and died in Long Beach, California.

References

External links
 
 
 

1876 births
1930 deaths
American male cyclists
Cyclists at the 1904 Summer Olympics
Olympic silver medalists for the United States in cycling
Olympic bronze medalists for the United States in cycling
Medalists at the 1904 Summer Olympics
Cyclists from Indiana